Hao or HAO may refer to:

People 
 Hao (surname)
 Hao (video gamer), Chinese professional Dota 2 player
 Leo Hao, Russian artist
Heather O'Reilly, Professional soccer player

Places 
 Hao (city), or Haojing, capital of the Western Zhou, near present-day Xi'an
 Xi'an, China, derived from the ancient city
 Hao (French Polynesia), an atoll
 Hao Airport
 Hao Prefecture, of imperial China
 Hao River, in Thailand
 Butler County Regional Airport IATA code

Other uses 
 Art name (Chinese: , hào)
 Hakö language, spoken in Papua New Guinea
 , a fictional character and the main antagonist in the manga and anime Shaman King
 High Altitude Observatory
 High Armanen Order
 Rauvolfia sandwicensis, a flowering plant
 Hydroxylamine oxidoreductase, an enzyme involved in the nitrogen cycle

See also

 Hau (disambiguation)
 How (disambiguation)
 Howe (disambiguation)